Han Jiahuai is a Chinese cell biologist and professor of the School of Life Sciences, Xiamen University. He was elected as a member of the Chinese Academy of Sciences in 2013. He is also a foreign member of the American Association of Immunologists and the American Society for Microbiology. Han is mainly known for his work in innate immune signaling, especially the discovery of p38 signaling pathway.

Han was born in January 1960 in Huainan, Anhui Province, China. He earned a master's degree at Peking University in 1985, and a doctor's degree at Université libre de Bruxelles in 1990. From 1990 to 1992 he did his postdoctoral research at the University of Texas Southwestern Medical Center. From 1993 to 2007 he worked at The Scripps Research Institute. He became a professor of Xiamen University in 2007, and also served as an adjunct professor at Scripps.

Most cited papers
  (Cited 2647 times, according to Google Scholar. )  
  (Cited 2034 times, according to Google Scholar. )  
  (Cited 1751 times, according to Google Scholar  ) 
  (Cited 919 times, according to Google Scholar. )

References

External links

Biologists from Anhui
Members of the Chinese Academy of Sciences
People from Huainan
Peking University alumni
1960 births
Living people